Maksim Andreyevich Gaidukov (born 6 March 1995) is a Russian football player. He plays for FC Metallurg Lipetsk.

Club career
He made his professional debut in the Russian Professional Football League for FC Rotor Volgograd on 19 September 2014 in a game against FC Terek-2 Grozny.

He made his Russian Football National League debut for FC Tekstilshchik Ivanovo on 7 July 2019 in a game against FC Yenisey Krasnoyarsk.

References

External links
 

1995 births
Sportspeople from Volgograd
Living people
Russian footballers
Association football midfielders
FC Rotor Volgograd players
FC Sakhalin Yuzhno-Sakhalinsk players
FC Znamya Truda Orekhovo-Zuyevo players
FC Volgar Astrakhan players
FC Tekstilshchik Ivanovo players
FC Nosta Novotroitsk players
FC Avangard Kursk players
FC Metallurg Lipetsk players
Russian Second League players
Russian First League players